Johanns v. Livestock Marketing Association, 544 U.S. 550 (2005), is a First Amendment case of the Supreme Court of the United States. At issue was whether a beef producer could be compelled to contribute to beef industry advertising.

Facts and prior history
Congress charters commodity checkoff programs compelling all producers of certain commodities to contribute to common research and advertising programs. The beef industry is covered by the Beef Promotion and Research Act (1985). Cattle producers disagreeing with the fee and represented by the Livestock Marketing Association sued the Department of Agriculture (USDA) in federal district court. The respondents alleged the government-required fee for advertising was compelled speech and  violated their First Amendment right to free speech. The USDA argued the advertising was government speech immune from First Amendment challenge.

The district court and the Eighth Circuit Court of Appeals had found for the Livestock Marketing Association previously, ruling that the program violated the First Amendment and that the advertising was compelled and not government speech.

In a parallel petition (No. 03–1165), the Nebraska Cattlemen sided with the USDA and sued the Livestock Marketing Association. At the Supreme Court, the two cases were consolidated.

Court decision
The Supreme Court's decision was announced on May 23, 2005 and delivered by Justice Antonin Scalia. The decision was 6-3 in favor of the USDA's position. Check-offs would continue. Advertising by these industry groups was government speech, therefore there was no infringement of First Amendment rights.

Case revisited
The case is starting another trip through the courts, starting in Montana with Ranchers-Cattlemen Action Legal Fund v. Sonny Perdue. 

The Cattlemen’s Beef Board (CBB) and USDA oversee the collection and spending of checkoff funds. Additionally, all producers selling cattle or calves, for any reason and regardless of age or sex, must pay $1-per-head. The buyer generally is responsible for collecting $1-per-head from the seller, but both are responsible for seeing that the dollar is collected and paid.

See also
List of United States Supreme Court cases by the Rehnquist Court
List of United States Supreme Court cases involving the First Amendment

References

External links
 

United States Free Speech Clause case law
United States Supreme Court cases
National Cattlemen's Beef Association
United States Supreme Court cases of the Rehnquist Court